William Drury (1527–1579) was an English statesman and soldier.

William Drury may also refer to:

William Drury (died 1558) (c. 1500–1558), Speaker of the House of Commons
William Drury (MP for Suffolk) (1550–1590), English landowner and member of parliament
William Drury (lawyer) (died 1589), Elizabethan jurist
William Drury (dramatist) (fl. 1641), English dramatist
William James Joseph Drury (1791–1878), English cleric and schoolmaster
William Price Drury (1861–1949), Royal Marine Light Infantry officer, novelist, playwright, and mayor of Saltash
William O'Bryen Drury (died 1811), officer of the British Royal Navy
William Drury Lowe (1802–1877), English landowner